Cecil B. Brown Jr. (July 29, 1926 – June 17, 2006) was an American activist, businessman, and legislator.

Born in Chicago, Illinois, Brown graduated from Marquette University. He was a salesman and tax accountant. He was active in the civil rights movement in Milwaukee, Wisconsin. He served in the Wisconsin State Assembly in 1955 as a member of the Democratic Party.

Notes

Businesspeople from Chicago
Politicians from Milwaukee
Marquette University alumni
1926 births
2006 deaths
20th-century American politicians
20th-century American businesspeople
Democratic Party members of the Wisconsin State Assembly